The following is a list of black films that were released in the 2010s. Black films listed here are generally associated with the peoples from the African diaspora; the cinema of Africa is distinct from this topic (see list of African films). Lawrence Ware of The New York Times said "the 2010s were the most important decade for black film in America" and that such films across various genres were "all being taken seriously critically, and most were successful financially".

List of films

2010

2011

2012

2013

2014

2015

2016

2017

2018

2019

References

Bibliography

External links
The 2010s: The Decade When Black Films Became Highbrow
The 20 Best Black Films Of The Last Decade

Black films, 2010s
African-American cinema